William Butler, Irish alchemist (c. 1534 – 29 January 1617), was, according to the Compendium of Irish Biography, "a well-known alchemist, the pretended discoverer of the philosopher's stone, and of a powder for bringing the dead to life, was born in Clare about 1534. He died at sea, on his passage to Spain, 29th January 1617."

The sources cited for his life by the Compendium were the Nouvelle Biographie Générale (46 volumes, Paris, 1855-1866), of which it stated "An interleaved copy, copiously noted by the late Dr. Thomas Fisher, Assistant Librarian of Trinity College, Dublin."

See also
 Edward Kelley

References

External links
 William Butler - Irish Biography
 A compendium of Irish biography: comprising sketches of distinguished Irishmen, and of eminent persons connected with Ireland by office or by their writings

1530s births
1617 deaths
16th-century Irish people
16th-century alchemists
17th-century Irish people
17th-century alchemists
17th-century occultists
Irish alchemists
Irish occultists
People from County Clare
People who died at sea